Audubon Aquarium is an aquarium in New Orleans, Louisiana, United States.

It is run by the Audubon Nature Institute, which also supervises Audubon Zoo, Audubon Louisiana Nature Center, Freeport-McMoRan Audubon Species Survival Center, Audubon Center for Research of Endangered Species (ACRES), Coastal Wildlife Network, Audubon Wilderness Park, and Audubon Park. It is located along the banks of the Mississippi River by the edge of the historic French Quarter off Canal Street, at the upper end of Woldenberg Park. It opened on September 1, 1990.

Exhibits
As its name implies, the aquarium specializes in aquatic life of the Americas.  The exhibits feature regions throughout North and South America.  With 10,000 animals representing 530 species, noteworthy exhibits include:

Amazon exhibit, encased in a glass cylinder, effectively a humid, climate-controlled greenhouse that is a prominent feature of the riverfront and includes macaws, piranhas, an anaconda, freshwater stingrays, and other specimens from the area basin;
Mississippi River gallery, featuring catfish, paddlefish, owls and a leucistic white alligator.

Katrina damage and aftermath 
In 2005, the facilities were affected by Hurricane Katrina. Though the structure survived the initial hurricane and was on high ground above the subsequent flooding of most of the city, electricity outages continued and the backup power generators were unable to fully operate the sophisticated life support systems needed to keep the animals alive. Aquarium staffers were forced to evacuate the facility only to return four days later to discover that most of the 10,000 fish did not survive.

The aquarium reopened on May 26, 2006.  Since Hurricane Katrina, more species have been in the Caribbean and jellyfish exhibits, and there has been a large revamp to the Gulf of Mexico tank simulating ocean life below an oil rig platform.

Gallery

References

External links 

 

1990 establishments in Louisiana
Aquaria in Louisiana
Audubon movement
Buildings and structures in New Orleans
Culture of New Orleans
Tourist attractions in New Orleans